Quicksilver is a line of single and two-place high wing, single-engine, ultralight aircraft that evolved from weight-shift hang gliders including Bob Lovejoy's High Tailer.

The earliest powered version, the Quicksilver C, was created as a self-launching hang glider, designed to allow pilots who lived in the flatlands to be able to self-launch without a hill. The design later evolved into an ultralight aircraft for powered cross-country flying.

The aircraft line has been in production since the late 1970s and remains in production in 2018 by Quicksilver Aircraft of Temecula, California.

Design and development
Founded by Dick Eipper, Eipper Formance began manufacturing the early Bob Lovejoy-designed Quicksilver ultralights in the late 1970s when hang gliding was very popular. The Quicksilver hang gliders differed from most hang gliders of that time period in that the Quicksilver had a rigid rectangular wing and a tail with a horizontal stabilizer and a rudder. At that time, the majority of hang gliders were simple Rogallo wing-type hang gliders.

Eipper added a seat, wheels, and a small engine behind the wing of the hang glider, and the Quicksilver ultralight was born. This aircraft was controlled by pushing a bar forwards and backwards, and side to side, in the same way that hang gliders are controlled. This shifted the center of gravity of the aircraft and allowed the pilot to control the plane. Many pilots wanted an aircraft that was controlled with a stick and rudder, similar to the way "typical" light airplanes are controlled, so Eipper added rudder and elevator control surfaces to the Quicksilver ultralight, giving it two axes of control. This aircraft was called the Quicksilver MX. The high dihedral of the wings caused the plane to bank when the aircraft was turned with the rudder, but there was no direct means of controlling the roll axis of the airplane—the aircraft only rolled in response to the yaw axis. Pilots still wanted a true three-axis control ultralight, so Eipper added spoilerons. The spoilerons were only minimally effective, providing only a minimal amount of control over the roll axis. The next generation of MX had true ailerons which gave the aircraft full roll authority.

The single-seat Quicksilver MX not only complies with the US FAR 103 Ultralight Vehicles rules, but was in fact the aircraft around which the rules were developed. The Quicksilver was the most popular ultralight aircraft design when the regulations were first drafted in the early 1980s.

The Quicksilver MX evolved over the years. A two-seat model was added for training purposes, although the two-seater was not legally an ultralight. Eipper Formance changed their name to Eipper Aircraft and then Quicksilver Aircraft, and they are still in business, although they are not producing aircraft in the quantity that they were at the height of the ultralight craze in the mid 1980s.

The current production MX Sports and Sprints are built from anodized aluminum tubing that is fastened together with bolts. The wings and tail are covered with pre-sewn Dacron envelopes. Reported construction times from the kit are 30–40 hours.

Operational history 

In the summer of 1982, Peter Burgher modified a Quicksilver MX-1 with longer wings, larger fuel tanks, and modified carburetor jets flew from Utica, Michigan to St. Petersburg, Florida on an endurance flight setting 56 world and national records.

Variants 

Quicksilver C
The rudder is deflected by movement of the sling seat to create a coordinated turn. The engine is mounted in pusher configuration at the trailing edge of the wing. There is no landing gear and the aircraft is foot-launched.
Quicksilver E
An evolution of the C design the E is a new design which incorporates tricycle landing gear, including a fixed, non-steerable nosewheel, but no brakes. Some E models have been flown on floats. The standard engine is a  Cuyuna 215R or a Yamaha go-cart engine. The E maintains the use of a weight-shift sling seat acting on the rudder, although it also acts on the elevator through a servo tab attached to the seat to boost weight-shift control authority.
Quicksilver MX Sprint
The Sprint is an evolution of the E model, with a fixed seat and three-axis controls and a steerable nosewheel. The Sprint features a cable-braced single surface wing and 2/3 span ailerons.
Quicksilver MX Sport
The Sport is an evolution of the Sprint, with the addition of a double-surface wing.
Quicksilver MX-2 Sprint
The MX-2 Sprint is a two-seat in side-by-side configuration ultralight trainer that features a cable-braced single surface wing.
Quicksilver MXL-2 Sport
The MXL-2 Sport is a two-seat in side-by-side configuration ultralight trainer that features a cable-braced double surface wing.
Quicksilver Sport II
The Sport II is a two-seat in side-by-side configuration ultralight trainer that features a strut-braced double surface wing.
Quicksilver Sport 2S
Quicksilver Sport 2SE
Version for the US light-sport aircraft category, introduced in 2014, with the Rotax 582   engine. The model is a Federal Aviation Administration approved special light-sport aircraft.

Specifications (Quicksilver MX Sport)

Comparable aircraft
AmEagle American Eaglet
Avid Champion
Birdman TL-1
Chotia Weedhopper
Kolb Flyer
Milholland Legal Eagle
Mitchell U-2 Superwing
Pterodactyl Ascender
UFM Easy Riser
Ultraflight Lazair
Zenair Zipper

References

Bibliography
 Cliche, Andre: Ultralight Aircraft Shopper's Guide 8th Edition. Cybair Limited Publishing, 2001.

External links

1970s United States ultralight aircraft
Single-engined pusher aircraft